Bouchercon is an annual convention of creators and devotees of mystery and detective fiction. It is named in honour of writer, reviewer, and editor Anthony Boucher; also the inspiration for the Anthony Awards, which have been issued at the convention since 1986. This page details Bouchercon XLV and the 2014 Anthony Awards ceremony.

Bouchercon 
The convention was held at Long Beach, California from 13–16 November 2014. The event was chaired by Ingrid Willis.

Special guests 
 Toastmaster: Simon Wood
 Fan Guest of Honor: Al Abramson
 American Guest of Honor: J. A. Jance
 International Guest of Honor: Edward Marston
 YA Guest of Honor: Eoin Colfer
 Lifetime Achievement: Jeffery Deaver
 The David Thompson Memorial Special Service Award: Judy Bobalik

Anthony Awards 
The following list details the awards distributed at the 2014 annual Anthony Awards ceremony.

External links 
 Official Website

References 

Anthony Awards
45